Sailakshmi Balijepally or Sai Balijepally (born 25th Jan 1975 ) is an Indian Pediatrician and the Founder of Ekam Foundation, an NGO working in the areas of Child and Maternal Health & Well Being. She was awarded the Nari Shakti Award in 2015 by the President of India.

Life 
Balijepally was brought up in Secunderabad where she attended Keyes High School for Girls for 12 years. Her parents were both doctors and it was expected that she would do to. Her elder sister was her role model and she was en route to being a cardiologist. She went on to St Francis College for Women for two years before gaining entry to the Gandhi Medical College. She was there for five years and she left qualified as both a physician and as a surgeon.

On 20 January 2001 an earthquake hit Gujarat killing 20,000, injuring many more and making 400,000 homeless. She stepped forward to volunteer then despite it clashing with her exams. Seven years later she volunteered again when the Bihar flood made millions homeless when a river changed course and flooded many inhabited areas.

She had been working as a junior consultant when she had tried to work out how to support 60 orphanages and she had teamed each one up with a colleague paediatrician. Her colleagues were keen to help but in time the system was not really working. The establishment of the EKAM foundation in 2009 was her attempt to refocus on the problem of supplying care.

Balijepally was awarded one of the first eight Nari Shakti Awards for her leadership and achievement in 2015. The award was made on International Women's Day from the then Indian President Pranab Mukherjee.

In 2018, her EKAM foundation went into a partnership with Royal Enfield with the aim of improving  the health and well-being of mothers and children in Kancheepuram. They were working with Chengalpattu Medical College.

References 

Living people
Indian paediatricians
1975 births